Isaac Welsh (July 20, 1811 – November 25, 1875) was a Republican politician in the state of Ohio who was in the Ohio House of Representatives, Ohio Senate, and was Ohio State Treasurer from 1872 until his death in 1875, when he was replaced by his son.

Isaac Welsh was born July 20, 1811 in Belmont County, Ohio. He was raised on a farm, and had little formal education. As an adult, he moved to Beallsville in Monroe County, and was in merchandising, but soon returned to Belmont. He was a Whig until that party collapsed.

In 1857, and 1859, he was elected to the Ohio House of Representatives for the 53rd and 54th General Assembly as a Republican. In 1861, he was elected from the 20th District to the Ohio Senate in the 55th General Assembly. Presidential elector for Grant/Colfax in 1868

Welsh was elected state treasurer in 1871, and again in 1873. He died November 25, 1875, and his son Leroy Welsh was appointed to serve the remaining weeks of his second term.

Welsh was married to Mary A. Armstrong of Belmont County.

Welsh was a Presbyterian.

Welsh died at his home at Washington Township, Belmont County, Ohio.

Notes

References

State treasurers of Ohio
Republican Party members of the Ohio House of Representatives
Republican Party Ohio state senators
People from Belmont County, Ohio
1811 births
1875 deaths
1868 United States presidential electors
19th-century American politicians
People from Beallsville, Ohio